Isabel Waidner (born 1974) is a German-British writer and cultural theorist based in London. They have written three novels: Sterling Karat Gold (2021, Peninsula Press), We are Made of Diamond Stuff (2019, Dostoyevsky Wannabe), and Gaudy Bauble (2017, Dostoyevsky Wannabe). We are Made of Diamond Stuff, set in the Isle of Wight where Waidner's partner is from, was nominated for the 2019 Goldsmiths Prize, and Sterling Karat Gold won the 2021 Goldsmiths Prize. They are also the editor of the anthology Liberating the Canon: An Anthology of Innovative Literature (2018, Dostoyevsky Wannabe) and have written for numerous publications including Granta, Frieze, the Cambridge Literary Review, and AQNB. Along with artist Richard Porter, Waidner is the co-founder of the Queers Read This event series hosted by the Institute of Contemporary Arts, and the host of the ICA's literary talk series, This Isn't a Dream, hosted fortnightly via Instagram Live.

Waidner's fourth novel Corey Fah Does Social Mobility is forthcoming in July 2023.

Biography 
Waidner was born in the Black Forest region of Germany. After spending two years in Frankfurt where HIV/AIDS had ravaged their generation of gay men and transgender women, they moved to East London in 1995 to be part of London's queer culture and community. After arriving in London, they worked at various minimum-wage jobs until they were awarded a scholarship for a PhD at the University of Roehampton. After receiving their doctorate, titled 'Experimental fiction, transliteracy, and 'Gaudy Bauble': towards a queer avant-garde poetics', they taught creative writing at the University of Roehampton. They currently teach at Queen Mary University of London in the School of English and Drama.

The German translation of Gaudy Bauble, translated by Ann Cotten, won the Internationaler Literaturpreis. Their first, second and third novels were shortlisted for the Republic of Consciousness Prize, in 2018, 2020 and 2022 respectively. Spurred by the Brexit referendum, they applied for British citizenship and became eligible for the Goldsmiths Prize. Waidner has written extensively about working-class queer and transgender people, nationalism, and how "the British novel tends to reproduce white, middle-class values and aesthetics", with their work standing in opposition to these motifs. 

Between 2009 and 2013, Waidner performed as part of the indie band Klang, releasing records through the UK labels Rough Trade Records and Blast First.

Bibliography

Awards 

 2018: Shortlisted for Republic of Consciousness Prize for Gaudy Bauble
 2019: Shortlisted for Goldsmith Prize for We are Made of Diamond Stuff
 2020: Shortlisted for Republic of Consciousness Prize for We are Made of Diamond Stuff
 2020: Winner of Internationaler Literaturpreis for Gaudy Bauble
 2021: Winner of Goldsmiths Prize for Sterling Karat Gold
 2022: Shortlisted for Republic of Consciousness Prize for Sterling Karat Gold
 2022: Shortlisted for Orwell Prize for Political Fiction for Sterling Karat Gold

References 

1974 births
Living people
Non-binary writers